Namak Paray is a Pakistani sitcom that premiered in 2013. The sitcom is directed and produced by Zeeshan Khan and written by Saba Hassan. Series was broadcast on Hum TV and starring Urwa Hocane, Salma Hassan, Ahmed Zaib and Mohsin Gillani. It was released on 11 June 2011.

Cast
Urwa Hocane
Ahmed Zaib
Salma Hassan
Farhat Nazar
Vasia Fatima
Osama bin sadiq

References

External links
 Hum TV official website

Hum TV original programming
Pakistani television sitcoms
2013 Pakistani television series debuts